The Archdiocesan Classic Gymnasium (often referred to by the abbreviation NKG) is a Catholic high school located on 106 Voćarska Road in the neighborhood of Šalata in Zagreb, Croatia. The school implements a program highlighting the classical culture and history, having students learn the Latin and the Ancient Greek. The school promotes Catholicism and serves as a public preparatory school for the Interdiocesan Boys' Seminary, a seminary for future Catholic priests located in the same building complex.

History 

The school was the successor to the Archdiocesan Lyceum. The Lyceum was founded in 1854 as a part of the Theology seminary. The school was founded in 1922 as the Archdiocesan Grand School, a boys-only school. In 1931 its name was changed to the name it bears today. In 1948 the communist regime of Josip Broz Tito denied official recognition to the school due to its religious ties. The school didn't stop operating, though. A military hospital was built nearby on the same lot. In 1989 the hospital was moved to a new complex on the Gojko Šušak Avenue in Dubrava. Following the Croatian declaration of independence in 1991, the school was again officially recognized. From 2003 girls are allowed to enroll the school, which has previously been boys-only. This diffused its previous religious role as a place to educate future priests and deacons, although Catholicism and devotion to God is still strongly encouraged.

Observatory 

The school is known in Croatia for having an observatory. The school routinely publishes articles about celestial objects on its website. The school website also displays a list of objects in the Messier catalogue. The observatory building sports the Croatian coat of arms on its northern side, one of the rare Croatian signs that weren't taken down during the anti-nationalistic communist rule of Croatia.

See also 
 List of astronomical observatories

References

External links 
 
 Archdiocesan Classical Gymnasium entry on skolehr.net

Educational institutions established in 1854
Catholic Church in Croatia
Gornji Grad–Medveščak
Schools in Croatia
Catholic schools in Croatia
Astronomical observatories in Croatia
Education in Zagreb
Gymnasiums in Croatia
Buildings and structures in Zagreb
1854 establishments in the Austrian Empire